William Valentine Graham (born 14 February 1959) is a Northern Irish retired professional footballer who played as a midfielder in the Football League for Brentford.

Career

Brentford 
After spells at Northampton Town and Stewarts & Lloyds Corby, Graham signed on trial for Fourth Division club Brentford in August 1977. He quickly established himself in the first team, signing a professional contract and making 32 appearances and scoring two goals during the 1977–78 season, helping the Bees to a fourth-place finish and promotion to the Third Division. Despite signing a new long-term contract, Graham's appearances tailed off in the Third Division and he departed the club in February 1981, having made 51 appearances and scored three goals for the Bees.

Non-League football 
Graham dropped into non-League football after leaving Brentford, joining Southern League South Division club Hillingdon Borough during the 1980–81 season. He later had spells at Bracknell Town, Camberley Town and Sandhurst Town.

Career statistics

Honours 
Brentford
 Football League Fourth Division fourth-place promotion: 1977–78

References

1959 births
Living people
People from Armagh (city)
Association footballers from Northern Ireland
Association football midfielders
Brentford F.C. players
Northampton Town F.C. players
Stewarts & Lloyds Corby A.F.C. players
Hillingdon Borough F.C. players
English Football League players
Bracknell Town F.C. players
Camberley Town F.C. players
Sandhurst Town F.C. players
Expatriate association footballers from Northern Ireland
Southern Football League players
Isthmian League players